Gmina Czernichów may refer to either of the following rural administrative districts in Poland:
Gmina Czernichów, Lesser Poland Voivodeship
Gmina Czernichów, Silesian Voivodeship